Robin David Stewart Higham (June 20, 1925 – August 27, 2015) was a British-American historian, specializing in aerospace and military history, who also served as a pilot with the Royal Canadian Air Force during World War II.

Early life and family 
Higham was born to a British veteran of the First World War (the literary agent, David Higham) and Margaret Anne Stewart, an American woman. Born in 1925, he grew up in London but had already met relatives in Texas and Oklahoma with his mother in 1929 and 1935. Following the outbreak of the Battle of Britain in 1940, Higham's parents sent him to the United States. He attended the Hotchkiss School in Connecticut.

Education and career 
From 1943 to 1947, he served as a pilot and flight sergeant in the Royal Canadian Air Force in Europe and Asia (Burma Road).

He studied at the University of New Hampshire and Harvard University, where he graduated with a bachelor's degree in 1950 cum laude. In 1953, he received his master's degree at Claremont Graduate University in California.

From 1954 to 1957, he was an instructor at the University of Massachusetts. Higham received a PhD in 1957 from Harvard with a dissertation on the development of aviation in Great Britain. For the next six years, until 1963, he was an assistant professor at the University of North Carolina, where he was co-founder of the National Security Seminar of Duke University and University of North Carolina. In 1963, he became a professor at Kansas State University. He became professor emeritus there in 1999.

Though he described himself as a "historical generalist" in a 1998 interview, Higham's primary publications were on the subject of aeronautics, especially military-scientific aspects. He did, however, also write extensively on geopolitics in general.

In 1977, he founded Sunflower University Press, which existed until 2005 and published books on military science and military history.

He was editor of Military Affairs (now The Journal of Military History) from 1968 to 1988 and of Aerospace Historian from 1970 to 1988. He was also the editor of the Journal of the West beginning in 1976.

Awards and honors 
Higham was a member in many aviation and military history organizations. His honors from these groups included the Social Science Research Council National Security Policy Research Fellowship, 1960–1961. In 1985, he received the first Samuel Eliot Morison Prize for Lifetime Achievement from the Society for Military History.  In 1986, Higham received the Victor Gondos Award (now The Edwin H. Simmons Award) for his outstanding service to the Society for Military History.

Personal life 
He married Barbara Davies on August 5, 1950.  They had a son and three daughters. He lived in Manhattan, Kansas. Higham became an American citizen in 1959.

Selected publications

References

External links 
 Higham Papers, Library Duke University
 Higham Papers, University of Texas

American historians
Royal Canadian Air Force personnel
Kansas State University faculty
Harvard University alumni
1925 births
2015 deaths
American military historians
Historians of aviation
British emigrants to the United States